Archbishop Ilsley Catholic School is a coeducational Roman Catholic secondary school and sixth form located in Acocks Green, Birmingham, England. The school is named after Edward Ilsley, former Archbishop of Birmingham.

Construction of the school commenced in 1955 and was completed in 1957. It is named after Archbishop Edward Ilsley, who built the first church in the village of Acocks Green in the early part of the 20th century. The school served many immigrant Catholic families who moved to Birmingham from the west coast of Ireland following World War II. The current headteacher is Miss H. Burrows.

In 2003, the school was named as one of the best schools nationwide in the Chief Inspector's Report to Parliament. It also received Technology College status. In 2004, it was described as being the "Most Improved" school by the Specialist Schools Trust. The school was also the first winner of the Healthy Schools Award.

Previously a voluntary aided school administered by Birmingham City Council, in May 2019 Archbishop Ilsley Catholic School converted to academy status. The school is now sponsored by the St Teresa of Calcutta Multi-Academy Company.

References

External links 
School website

Secondary schools in Birmingham, West Midlands
Catholic secondary schools in the Archdiocese of Birmingham
Academies in Birmingham, West Midlands